Michów may refer to the following places in Poland:
Michów, Lower Silesian Voivodeship (south-west Poland)
Michów, Lublin Voivodeship (east Poland)